The Huai Army, named for the Huai River, was a military force allied with the Qing dynasty raised to contain the Taiping Rebellion in 1862. It was also called the Anhui Army because it was based in Anhui province. It helped to restore the stability of the Qing dynasty. Unlike the traditional Green Standard Army or Eight Banners forces of the Qing, the Huai Army was largely a militia army, based on personal rather than institutional loyalties. It was armed with a mixture of traditional and modern weapons. Li Hongzhang, a commander in the Xiang Army, created the Huai Army in October 1861. It succeeded Zeng Guofan’s Xiang Army. The Huai Army itself was succeeded by the New Army and the Beiyang Army, which were created in the late 19th century.

Founding 
Before recovering Anqing in late 1861, Zeng Guofan ordered his student Li Hongzhang to bring some of the Xiang Army back to Anhui, Li's homeland, for military service and to organize an independent force under Li Hongzhang's command. Their total strength was 25,000 soldiers, including some Taiping soldiers in Anqing who had surrendered. Li combined these forces into one army, and after three months of training they fought their first battle, the Battle of Shanghai (1861).

Li Hongzhang was in overall command of the Huai Army, which was part of the new series of regional armies known as the Yong Ying, introduced into China after the Nian Rebellion. Unlike the Manchu Eight Banners or the Green Standard Army, officers in these regional armies were not rotated; they chose the soldiers under their command and formed paternalistic relationships with them. These armies were equipped with modern weapons.

History 

Officers from the Anhwei Army such as Ch'a Lien-piao (Zha Lianbiao) also studied Western military drill overseas in Germany,

Gen. Zhou Shengchuan was the t'ung-ling/tongling (commander) of one of the Anhui Army's best units in Zhihli. He encouraged the purchase of modern, foreign weapons to Li Hongzhang. The Anhwei Army's paternalism and the relationships between soldiers and officers was praised by Gen. Zhou, who also practiced nepotism in his unit.

Western military drill was implemented by Zhou, officers being encouraged to participate. Rewards and punishments were implemented for respectively good and bad marksmanship, with "badges of merit" and money given out.

Zhou was extremely interested in modern technology such as medicine, telegraphs and railways, criticizing British advisor Charles Gordon for not considering the use of them extensively in war. Li Hongzhang's German instructor officers were criticized by Zhou over their lack of knowledge of prone firing and fighting at night time. Westerners and Japanese praised his troops, and they were considered "first-rate". Zhou said that a '"twilight air" had settled upon the force after two decades, and its performance declined.

Non Commissioned officers in the Anhwei Army were given "special training".

Li Hongzhang gave high ranking officerships in the Green Standard Army of Zhihli to officers from the Anhui Army.

Units of the Anhui Army served against the French in Tonkin and Formosa during the Sino-French War.  Although they were occasionally victorious, they lost most of the battles in which they were engaged.

Anhui Army troops were stationed in various provinces all across China such as Zhihli, Shanxi, Hubei, Jiangsu, and Shaanxi by the government, around 45,000 in total. They also fought in the First Sino-Japanese War.

General Liu Mingchuan's leadership over the Anhwei Army enabled the Chinese to match up against the French forces in combat on Taiwan.

When the French attempted to seize Taiwan's Keelung forts, and attack near Tamsui, they were beaten back by the Anhwei soldiers under General Liu.

Most of the Huai army officers did not hold official degrees and titles, since after the modernization introduced into the Chinese military, more common people rather than scholars began to enlist in military service.

Officers

Main leaders
Li Hongzhang
Liu Bingzhang
Cheng Xuechi
Liu Mingchuan
Guo Songlin
Yuan Jiasan

Secondary leaders
Yuan Shikai
Zhang Shusheng
Zhang Shushang
Pan Dingxin

References

Draft History of Qing

 
Military history of Anhui
Military history of Jiangsu
Military history of Henan
19th century in China
Military history of the Qing dynasty
Military units and formations of the Qing dynasty
1862 establishments in China
Taiping Rebellion